is a Japanese animator, animation director and character designer from Osaka, Japan.

Anime credits
Aquarian Age: Sign for Evolution: Animation (OP/ED)
Clannad movie: Character Design
D.N.Angel: Animation director (ep 20)
Generator Gawl: Animation director (ep 3)
Genesis Survivor Gaiarth: Key Animation (Ep 3; MU FILM, Ltd.)
Kiddy Grade: Character Design, Animation director (OP), Eyecatch Illustration (ep 1)
Kiddy Grade movies: Character Design
Kiddy Girl-and: Character Design
Kishin Taisen Gigantic Formula: Original Character Design
Legend of Himiko: Animation Character Design
Level C: Animation
Magic Knight Rayearth 2: Animation director (eps 36, 45)
Martian Successor Nadesico: Animation director (characters)
Metal Fighter Miku: Principal Drawing
Oshare Majo Love and Berry: Shiawase no Mahou: Chief Animation Director, Character Designer.
Petopeto-san: Key Animation (OP)
Pretear: Animation director (ep 11)
Rayearth (OVA): Character Design
Shuffle!: Key Animation (ED)
Uta-Kata: Character Design
Vampire Knight: Key Animation (OP)
Vampire Princess Miyu: Animation director (ep 26, OP, ED), Assistant Animation Director (ep 20), Character Planning
Zettai Karen Children: Key Animation (ED)

External links

Anime directors
People from Osaka Prefecture
Japanese animators
Japanese animated film directors
Living people
1970 births